Stax can refer to:

 StAX, (Computer Programming) Streaming API for reading and writing XML in Java
 Stax Ltd, a Japanese brand of electrostatic headphones
 Stax Records, an American record company
 Lay's Stax, a brand of potato snack chips sold by Lay's